Shiegho (also, Seacos and Si-a-ko) is a former Pomo settlement in Mendocino County, California. It was located near Hopland; its precise location is unknown.

Stephen Powers describes it as "a very small tribe or village".

References

Former settlements in Mendocino County, California
Former populated places in California
Pomo villages